Laïka Fatien is a French singer aka Laika.

Personal life
She was born in Paris in 1968. Her mother is Moroccan, and her father is from Ivory Coast.

She studied at ARIAL Île-de-France, CIM and IACP (jazz music schools).

Music career
Laïka is the first French artist to be signed by Universal Music Group. Here she recorded "Nebula" produced by Meshell Ndegeocello, and "Come a Little Closer" featuring Roy Hargrove, Ambrose Akinmusire, Graham Haynes & Rufus Reid, produced by Jay Newland & Jean-Philippe Allard and arranged by Gil Goldstein. The album artwork for "Come a Little Closer" was created by Sylvia Plachy the photographer. 

With her talent deeply rooted in Paris, Laika was often called on to accompany various artists such as: Vanessa Paradis and Rockin' Squat and was featured on pianist Ran Blake's recording of "Cocktails at Dusk". In 2016, Laika featured on Disney's homage recording entitled "Jazz Loves Disney" alongside Gregory Porter, Melody Gardot and Jamie Cullum.

Issey Miyake, the Japanese designer selected Laïka as his "European Muse" for the Tokyo Universal Exhibition in Japan

She performed at the Luminato Festival in the 70th Birthday Concert for Joni Mitchell at Massey Hall, Toronto, Canada

In 2016, she created with her husband, Christopher Thomas, the band Laïka & The Unit.

Acting
After a workshop with Jack Garfein (Actors Studio) in 1998, her interest in theater started to grow. She has worked on and performed in a variety of television and theater productions such as:

The Six Companions and The Black Princess as The Black Princess (TV series, TF1, France)

A Drum is a Woman as Madame Zajj, directed by Jérôme Savary with music by Duke Ellington (National Theater of Chaillot, France)

Los Sobrinos del Capitan Grant as Princess Maori, directed by Paco Mir Tricicle (La Zarzuela Theater, Madrid, Spain)

Celestina Del Sol, title role in a play by José Rivera with Opera-Jazz Directed by François Rancillac. This was performed at the Théâtre de la Ville in Paris and the Anger-Nantes Opéra.

Sources 
 Philippe Carles, André Clergeat, Jean-Louis Comolli: Le nouveau dictionnaire du jazz. R. Laffont: Paris 2011

References

External links
Biography 
FB
Review of Look at Me Now, Jazz Times, December 2006

1968 births
Living people
French people of Ivorian descent
French women singers
French people of Italian descent